La voce (The voice in English) is a song recorded by Italian singer Laura Pausini, for her third studio album, Le cose che vivi, released in September 1996. It's the sixth and final single of the album.

The song was written by Cheope and Fabrizio Pausini, Laura's father. A Spanish-language version, titled "La voz" was recorded and included on the Spanish version of "Le cose che vivi", "Las cosas que vives".

Both versions of the song were performed during the "World Wide Tour 1997", but since such concerts of this tour didn't spawn any DVD, no live recording has been ever released. However, Pausini promoted the album with a performance on the TV show 105 Night Express, which included this and other songs.

Due to the song not being released physically as CD-Singles, no music video was made.

Tracks
CDS - Promo Warner Music Italy
La voce

CDS - Promo Warner Music Spain
La voz

Digital download
La voce
La voz

Notes

Laura Pausini songs
Italian-language songs
Spanish-language songs
1997 singles
Songs written by Cheope
1996 songs